Sir Steve Rodney McQueen  (born 9 October 1969) is a British film director, film producer, screenwriter, and video artist. He is known for his award-winning film 12 Years a Slave (2013), an adaptation of Solomon Northup's 1853 slave narrative memoir. He also directed and co-wrote Hunger (2008), a historical drama about the 1981 Irish hunger strike, Shame (2011), a drama about an executive struggling with sex addiction, and Widows (2018), an adaptation of the British television series of the same name set in contemporary Chicago. In 2020, he released Small Axe, a collection of five films "set within London's West Indian community from the late 1960s to the early '80s".

For his artwork, McQueen has received the Turner Prize, the highest award given to a British visual artist. In 2006, he produced Queen and Country, which commemorates the deaths of British soldiers in Iraq by presenting their portraits as a sheet of stamps. For services to the visual arts, he was appointed Commander of the Order of the British Empire in 2011. For 12 Years a Slave, he won the Academy Award for Best Picture, the BAFTA Award for Best Film, the Golden Globe Award for Best Motion Picture – Drama, and the New York Film Critics Circle Award for Best Director. McQueen is the first black filmmaker to win the Academy Award for Best Picture.

In 2014, Time magazine included McQueen in its annual Time 100 list of the "most influential people in the world". In 2016, he was granted the British Film Institute's highest honour, the BFI Fellowship. McQueen was knighted in the 2020 New Year Honours, for services to film. In the same year, McQueen was awarded the Award for Cinematic Production by the Royal Photographic Society and is to receive Cologne Film Prize in honor of his life's work this year.

Early years
McQueen was born in London to a Grenadian mother and a Trinidadian father, his parents both having migrated to England. He grew up in Ealing, West London and went to Drayton Manor High School. In a 2014 interview, McQueen stated that he had a very bad experience in school, where he had been placed into a class for students believed best suited "for manual labour, more plumbers and builders, stuff like that". McQueen stated that, when he returned to present some achievement awards, the new head of the school claimed that there had been institutional racism at the time. McQueen added that he was dyslexic and had to wear an eyepatch because of a lazy eye, and reflected this may be why he was "put to one side very quickly".

He was a keen football player, turning out for the St. George's Colts football team. He took A-level art at Ealing, Hammersmith and West London College, then studied art and design at Chelsea College of Arts and then fine art at Goldsmiths College, University of London, where he first became interested in film. He left Goldsmiths and studied briefly at New York University's Tisch School of the Arts in the United States. He found the approach there too stifling and insufficiently experimental, complaining that "they wouldn't let you throw the camera up in the air". His artistic influences include Andy Warhol, Sergei Eisenstein, Dziga Vertov, Jean Vigo, Buster Keaton, Carl Theodor Dreyer, Robert Bresson, and Billy Wilder.

Career

1990s: Short films and visual art
McQueen's films as an artist were typically projected onto one or more walls of an enclosed space in an art gallery, and often in black-and-white and minimalistic. He has cited the influence of the nouvelle vague and the films of Andy Warhol. He often appeared in the films himself. McQueen met the art curator Okwui Enwezor in 1995 at the Institute of Contemporary Arts, London. Enwezor became a mentor to him as well as a friend and had a significant influence on McQueen's work.

His first major work was Bear (1993), in which two naked men (one of them McQueen) exchange a series of glances that might be taken to be flirtatious or threatening. Deadpan (1997) is a restaging of a Buster Keaton stunt in which a house collapses around McQueen, who is left unscathed because he is standing where there is a missing window.

As well as being in black-and-white, both these films are silent. The first of McQueen's films to use sound was also the first to use multiple images: Drumroll (1998). This was made with three cameras, two mounted to the sides, and one to the front of an oil drum, which McQueen rolled through the streets of Manhattan. The resulting films are projected on three walls of an enclosed space. McQueen has also made sculptures such as White Elephant (1998), as well as photographs.

He won the Turner Prize in 1999, although much of the publicity went to Tracey Emin, who was also a nominee. In 2006, he went to Iraq as an official war artist. The following year he presented Queen and Country, a piece that commemorated the deaths of British soldiers who died in the Iraq War by presenting their portraits as sheets of stamps. A proposal to have the stamps placed in circulation was rejected by the Royal Mail.

His 2007 short film Gravesend depicted the process of coltan refinement and production. It premiered at The Renaissance Society in the United States.

2000s: Breakthrough as filmmaker 
In 2008, his first feature-length film Hunger, about the 1981 Irish hunger strike, premiered at the Cannes Film Festival. McQueen received the Caméra d'Or (first-time director) Award at Cannes, the first British director to win the award. The film was also awarded the inaugural Sydney Film Festival Prize, for "its controlled clarity of vision, its extraordinary detail and bravery, the dedication of its cast and the power and resonance of its humanity". The film also won the 2008 Diesel Discovery Award at the Toronto International Film Festival. The award is voted on by the press attending the festival. Hunger also won the Los Angeles Film Critics Association award for a New Generation film in 2008 and the best film prize at the London Evening Standard Film Awards in 2009.

McQueen represented Britain at the 2009 Venice Biennale. In 2009, it was announced that McQueen has been tapped to direct Fela, a biopic about the Nigerian musician and activist Fela Kuti.

2010s: Further success 

In 2011, McQueen's second major theatrical film Shame was released. Set in New York City, it stars Michael Fassbender as a sex addict whose life is suddenly turned upside-down when his estranged sister (Carey Mulligan) reappears. The film was premiered at Venice Film Festival and was shown at the New York Film Festival and the Toronto Film Festival. It received critical acclaim with Roger Ebert of Chicago Sun-Times giving the film four out of four stars and describing it as "a powerful film" and "courageous and truthful", commenting that "this is a great act of filmmaking and acting. I don't believe I would be able to see it twice." Ebert would later name it his second best film of 2011. Todd McCarthy of The Hollywood Reporter gave the film a positive review, stating, "Driven by a brilliant, ferocious performance by Michael Fassbender, Shame is a real walk on the wild side, a scorching look at a case of sexual addiction that's as all-encompassing as a craving for drugs."

McQueen's next film was 12 Years a Slave (2013). Based on the 1853 autobiography of the same name by Solomon Northup, the film tells the story of a free black man who is kidnapped in 1841 and sold into slavery, working on plantations in the state of Louisiana for twelve years before being released. The film won the Academy Award for Best Picture in March 2014, becoming the first Best Picture winner to have a black director or producer. The film also won a supporting actress Oscar for Lupita Nyong'o. On the process of making 12 Years a Slave, actor and producer Brad Pitt stated: "Steve was the first to ask the big question, 'Why has there not been more films on the American history of slavery?'. And it was the big question it took a Brit to ask."

In 2012, McQueen debuted a new artistic installation "End Credits", which focuses on the political persecution of Paul Robeson, with over 10 hours each of video footage and audio recordings, unsynced. It has been exhibited at a number of locations including the Art Institute of Chicago, Whitney Museum of American Art in New York City, Perez Art Museum (Miami), and (upcoming June 2019) International Performing Arts festival in Amsterdam. In 2014 he announced plans to do a feature film on Robeson with Harry Belafonte.

In 2013, McQueen signed on to develop Codes of Conduct, a six-episode limited series for HBO. However, after the pilot episode was shot, HBO shut down production. He also worked on a BBC drama about the lives of black Britons, which follows a group of friends and their families from 1968 to 2014.

In 2015, McQueen shot the video for Kanye West's single "All Day". The film was screened at Fondation Louis Vuitton in Paris on 7 March 2015 before the first concert of a four-night residency by the American artist, at the Frank Gehry-designed building, began. The film subsequently received its American premiere at the Los Angeles County Museum of Art in July 2015.

In 2018, McQueen directed Widows, which was co-written with Gone Girl writer Gillian Flynn and based on the 1983 British series of the same name. Viola Davis starred in the heist thriller about four armed robbers who are killed in a failed heist attempt, only to have their widows step up to finish the job. He also directed a 1-minute commercial for Chanel's men fragrance Bleu de Chanel starring Gaspard Ulliel.

2020s: Anthology series 
In 2019, it was announced that Small Axe, an anthology series of five films created and directed by McQueen, would be released on BBC One and Amazon Prime Video. Some form of the series had been in development since 2012, and was first announced in 2014. The series focuses on "five stories set within London's West Indian community from the late 1960s to the early '80s". Three films in the series premiered at the New York Film Festival, receiving critical acclaim. The series was released weekly on BBC One and Amazon Prime Video starting in November 2020.

The anthology was a particularly personal project for McQueen, as it portrays the larger community that he grew up in. They are films he felt should have been made "35 years ago, 25 years ago, but they weren't".

To close the Anthology, McQueen chose to base the final film, Education, on a story from his own life.

The anthology, particularly the films Mangrove and Lovers Rock, received numerous accolades and appeared on several critics' top ten lists. Lovers Rock was the top-ranked film in Sight & Sound's best films of 2020, an aggregation of top 10 lists by the magazine's contributors. Both Mangrove and Lovers Rock were selected for Cannes in 2020, and had the festival not been cancelled due to the COVID-19 pandemic, McQueen would have been the first director to have two films in competition in Cannes in the same year.

According to Film Stage, Jordan Raup reported that McQueen was continuing to direct a WWII documentary titled The Occupied City dealing with the occupation of Amsterdam by German forces between 1940 and 1945, still in progress as of March 2022.

He is set to return to feature filmmaking with Blitz, a story about Londoners during "The Blitz" of World War II, which he will write, direct and produce. The film will be released on Apple TV+.

Short films
Bear (1993) was McQueen's first major film, presented at the Royal College of Art in London. Although not an overtly political piece, for many it raised questions about race, sexual attraction to men, and violence. It shows a wrestling match between two men who alternate ambiguous relations and gestures of aggression and erotic attraction. Like all McQueen's early films, Bear is black-and-white, and was shot on 16-millimetre film. It was featured in a two-part film exhibition at the Smithsonian Institution Hirshhorn Museum and Sculpture Garden in Washington, D.C.

Five Easy Pieces (1995) is a short film by McQueen. It follows a woman across a tight-rope; McQueen has stated that he finds a tight-rope walker to be "the perfect image of a combination of vulnerability and strength".

Just Above My Head (1996) is a short film which shares close ties with McQueen's preceding film with the key theme of walking. A man – played by McQueen – is shot in a way so as to crop out his body, but his head appears small at the bottom of the image, rising and falling with his step and coming in and out of frame according to the movement of the camera. As stated by David Frankel, the "simultaneous fragility and persistence" is seemingly meant as a metaphor for black life in England as elsewhere.

Deadpan (1997) is a four-minute black and white short film directed by and starring McQueen showing a multitude of angles on a reenactment of a stunt from Buster Keaton's Steamboat Bill, Jr.. Frieze Magazine noted his lack of shoelaces and inferred a multitude of depth and commentary on the prison system. Media Art noted that his use of black and white emulates 1920s film style without "a historicizing strategy or to reinterpret the origins of moving images". The film was exhibited on loop in the Museum of Modern Art's Contemporary Galleries, 1980-Now from 17 November 2011 to 17 February 2014.

Exodus (1997) is a 65-second colour video that takes the title of a record by Bob Marley as its starting point. It records a found event, two black men carrying potted palms whom McQueen followed down a London street, the greenery waving precariously above their heads. Then they get on a bus and leave.

Western Deep (2002), commissioned for documenta 11, constitutes a powerful exploration of the sensory experience of the TauTona Gold Mine in South Africa, showing migrant labourers working in dark, claustrophobic environments and the ear-splitting noise of drilling.

Running Thunder (2007), an 11-minute short film of a dead horse in a meadow. It was bought by the Stedelijk Museum in Amsterdam in 2014.

Personal life
McQueen is married to Bianca Stigter, a Dutch cultural critic, with whom he has two children, Alex and Dexter. Since 1997 the McQueens have kept a home in Amsterdam, in addition to their home in London. He was appointed Officer of the Order of the British Empire (OBE) in the 2002 Birthday Honours, Commander of the Order of the British Empire (CBE) in the 2011 New Year Honours for services to the visual arts, and was knighted in the 2020 New Year Honours for services to film. McQueen has been twice listed in the Powerlist Top 10 of the most influential Black Britons.

McQueen is a fan of English football club Tottenham Hotspur F.C.

Filmography
Short films
 Bear (1993)
 Five Easy Pieces (1995)
 Just Above My Head (1996)
 Stage (1996)
 Exodus (1997)
 Deadpan (1997)
 Girls, Tricky (2001)
 Illuminer (2002)
 Western Deep (2002)
 Charlotte (2004)
 Gravesend (2007)
 Giardini (2009)
 Static (2009)

Feature films

Television

Awards and nominations

References

Further reading
 Brockington, Horace. "Logical Anonymity: Lorna Simpson, Steve McQueen, Stan Douglas". International Review of African American Art 15, no. 3 (1998): 20–29.
 Demos, T. J. "Giardini: A Fairytale". In Steve McQueen (British Pavilion, Venice Biennale, 2009).
 Demos, T. J. "Moving Image of Globalization [On Steve McQueen's Gravesend]" and "Indeterminacy and Bare Life in Steve McQueen's Western Deep". The Migrant Image: The Art and Politics of Documentary During Global Crisis (Durham: Duke University Press, 2013), 21–32 and 33–54.
 Downey, Anthony. "Steve McQueen: Western Deep and Carib's Leap". Wasafiri, no. 37 (Winter 2002): 17–20.
 Downey, Anthony. "Steve McQueen: 'Once Upon a Time' ". Journal of Visual Culture, vol. 5, no. 1 (2006), pp. 119–125.

External links

 
 
 
 Interview with Steve McQueen at MUBI
 Thomas Dane Gallery: Steve McQueen
 Marian Goodman Gallery: Steve McQueen
 BBC profile
 Queen and Country
 Steve McQueen on re-title.com
 Steve McQueen: Exhibition at Fundació Antoni Tàpies (5 December 2003 – 15 February 2004)
 Steve McQueen in conversation with Adrian Searle, 24 May 2013 (46-minute video), and with Hamza Walker, 17 March 2013 (71-minute video).
 Adrian Searle, "Steve McQueen's city of cinemas makes voyeurs of us all", The Guardian, 21 March 2013.
 Adrian Searle, "Steve McQueen review – like a punch in the gut" (Thomas Dane Gallery, London), The Guardian, 13 October 2014.
 Kiran Mathur Mohammed, "Oscar-winner Sir Steve McQueen: Small Axe tells the story of West Indians in 1970-80s London", Trinidad and Tobago Newsday, 27 December 2020.

1969 births
Living people
Alumni of Chelsea College of Arts
Alumni of Goldsmiths, University of London
Artists commissioned by the Imperial War Museum
Black British artists
Black British filmmakers
British film producers
British video artists
Commanders of the Order of the British Empire
Directors of Caméra d'Or winners
English contemporary artists
English expatriates in the Netherlands
English film directors
English male sculptors
English people of Grenadian descent
English people of Trinidad and Tobago descent
English sculptors
English-language film directors
European Film Awards winners (people)
Filmmakers who won the Best Film BAFTA Award
Golden Globe Award-winning producers
Independent Spirit Award for Best Director winners
Knights Bachelor
People educated at Drayton Manor High School
People from Hanwell
People with dyslexia
Postmodernist filmmakers
Producers who won the Best Picture Academy Award
Tisch School of the Arts alumni
Turner Prize winners